Daniel Muñoz de la Nava and Aleksandr Nedovyesov were the defending champions but they decided not to compete this year.

Alexander Kudryavtsev and Denys Molchanov won the title after defeating Sanchai and Sonchat Ratiwatana 6–2, 6–2 in the final.

Seeds

Draw

Draw

References
 Main Draw

"GDD CUP" International Challenger Guangzhou - Doubles
China International Guangzhou